The 2018–19 Maltese Division 1 season, is the premier men's basketball competition in Malta.

Competition format
Seven teams joined the regular season and competed in a double-legged round-robin tournament. The four best qualified teams of the regular season joined the playoffs.

Regular season

League table

Results

Playoffs
The semifinals were played in a best-of-three-games format, while the finals in a best-of-five (1-1-1-1-1) format.

Bracket

Semi-finals

|}

Finals

|}

References

External links
Malta Basketball Association
Eurobasket.com

Moldovan
Basketball in Malta